Alabama Chicken is the third album by American folk musician Sean Hayes. It was released on September 8, 2003.

Track listing
 "Moonrise"
 "Little Maggie"
 "Here We Are..."
 "Alabama Chicken"
 "Walkin' Down the Line"
 "Smoking Signals"
 "Balancing Act in Blue"
 "Two Big Eyes"
 "Everyday Hamlet"
 "Diamond in the Sun"
 "The Rain Coming Down"
 "Rattlesnake Charm (Dream Machine)"

References

2003 albums
Sean Hayes (musician) albums